Pinus rigida, the pitch pine, is a small-to-medium-sized pine. It is native to eastern North America, primarily from central Maine south to Georgia and as far west as Kentucky. It is found in environments which other species would find unsuitable for growth, such as acidic, sandy, and low-nutrient soils.

Description
The pitch pine is irregular in shape, but grows to ). Branches are usually twisted, and it does a poor job at self-pruning. Trunks are usually straight with a slight curve, covered in large, thick, irregular plates of bark. Pitch pine has an exceptionally high regenerative ability; if the main trunk is cut or damaged by fire, it can re-sprout using epicormic shoots. This is one of its many adaptations to fire, which also include a thick bark to protect the sensitive cambium layer from heat. Burnt pitch pines often form stunted, twisted trees with multiple trunks as a result of the resprouting. This characteristic makes it a popular species for bonsai.

Pitch pine is rapid-growing when young, gaining around one foot of height per year under optimal conditions, until growth slows at 50–60 years. By 90 years of age, the amount of annual height gain is minimal. Open-growth trees begin bearing cones in as little as three years, with shade-inhabiting pines taking a few years longer. Cones take two years to mature. Seed dispersal occurs over the fall and winter, and trees cannot self-pollinate. The lifespan of a pitch pine is about 200 years or longer.

Taxonomy 
It was given its scientific name, Pinus rigida, by British botanist Philip Miller. It belongs to the family Pinaceae and the subgenus Pinus (formerly Diploxylon), along with other hard pines.

Distribution and habitat
Pitch pine is found mainly in the southern areas of the northeastern United States, from coastal Maine and Ohio to Kentucky and northern Georgia. A few stands occur in southern Quebec and Ontario, mostly in two pockets along the St. Lawrence River. It is known as a pioneer species and is often the first tree to vegetate a site after it has been cleared away. It is a climax vegetation type in extreme conditions, but in most cases it is replaced by oaks and other hardwoods. This pine occupies a variety of habitats, from dry, acidic sandy uplands to swampy lowlands, and can survive in very poor conditions. It is the primary tree of the New Jersey Pine Barrens.

Ecology 
Pitch pines provide habitat and food for many wildlife species. They are used for cover and nesting by birds such as the pine warbler, wild turkey, red-cockaded woodpecker, great-crested flycatcher, blue jay, black-capped chickadee, black-and-white warbler, Nashville warbler, and chestnut-sided warbler. Deer consume seedlings and new sprouts, and small mammals and birds eat the seeds.

This species occasionally hybridizes with other pine species, such as loblolly pine (Pinus taeda), shortleaf pine (Pinus echinata), and pond pine (Pinus serotina); the last is treated as a subspecies of pitch pine by some botanists.

Uses
Pitch pine is not a major timber tree due to the frequency of multiple or crooked trunks, nor is it as fast-growing as other eastern American pines. However, it grows well on unfavorable sites. In the past, it was a major source of pitch and timber for ship building, mine timbers, and railroad ties because the wood's high resin content preserves it from decay. As such, it has also been used for elaborate wood constructions, e. g. radio towers.

Pitch pine is currently used mainly for rough construction, pulp, crating, and fuel. However, due to its uneven growth, quantities of high quality can be difficult to obtain, and large lengths of pitch pine can be very costly.

Archaeology indicates that the Iroquois, Shinnecock, and Cherokee all utilized pitch pine. The Iroquois used the pitch to treat rheumatism, burns, cuts, and boils. Pitch also worked as a laxative. A pitch pine poultice was used by both the Iroquois and the Shinnecock to open boils and to treat abscesses. The Cherokee used pitch pine wood in canoe construction and for decorative carvings.

Pitch pine is known to cross with pond loblolly and shortleaf pines. One of those crosses is the pitlolly pine (pinus x rigitaeda), a natural hybrid between the loblolly pine and the pitch pine. This hybrid combines the tall size of the loblolly pine and the cold-hardiness of the pitch pine. This hybrid was used as substitute of loblolly pine and has been extensively planted in South Korea.

Gallery

References

rigida
Trees of the Eastern United States
Pinus rigida
Flora of the Appalachian Mountains
Trees of the Southeastern United States
Trees of the Northeastern United States
Flora of Massachusetts
Trees of Ontario
Pinus rigida
Pinus rigida
Garden plants of North America
Plants used in bonsai
Pinus rigida
Trees of the Great Lakes region (North America)
Taxa named by Philip Miller